Edward Osbaldeston was an English martyr, born about 1560. Не was hanged, drawn and quartered at York, 16 November 1594.

Life
Edward Osbaldeston was born about 1560 at Osbaldeston Hall near Blackburn, Lancashire. He was the son of Thomas Osbaldeston, and nephew of Edward Osbaldeston, of Osbaldeston Hall. He went to the English College of Douai, then at Reims, where he was ordained deacon in December 1583, and priest 21 September 1585. He was sent on the English mission 27 April 1589, and was apprehended at night through the instrumentality of an Anglican priest named Thomas Clark at an inn at Tollerton, Yorkshire, upon St. Jerome's day, 30 September 1594.

He had said his first Mass on the feast day of St. Jerome, and in consequence had a great devotion to that saint.

The day following his arrest he was taken to York where he was tried at the next assizes and attained of high treason for being a priest.

Bishop Challoner prints the greater part of a letter addressed by the martyr to his fellow-prisoners in York Castle, the full text of which is still extant, and which reveals the great humility and serene trust in God with which he anticipated his death.

Edward Osbaldeston was among the eighty-five martyrs of England and Wales beatified by Pope John Paul II on 22 November 1987.

See also
 Catholic Church in the United Kingdom
 Douai Martyrs

References

1594 deaths
People from Ribble Valley (district)
16th-century English Roman Catholic priests
People executed under the Tudors for treason against England
People executed under Elizabeth I by hanging, drawing and quartering
16th-century Roman Catholic martyrs
Year of birth unknown
Executed people from Lancashire
English beatified people
Eighty-five martyrs of England and Wales